Union Jacks is The Babys’ fourth album, which peaked at number 42 on the Billboard 200 in 1980. The lead single "True Love True Confession" failed to chart and was succeeded by the minor hit "Midnight Rendezvous," and finally the hit single "Back on My Feet Again", which was their last Top 40 hit, reaching #33. The band recorded a fifth album, On the Edge, then split. Union Jacks was reissued on 26 May 2009 under Rock Candy Records after being out of print for many years. There are no bonus tracks, but all of the tracks have been remastered. This was the first Babys album to feature keyboardist Jonathan Cain and bassist Ricky Phillips.

Track listing 
 "Back on My Feet Again" (John Waite, Dominic Bugatti, Frank Musker) - 3:18
 "True Love True Confession" (Waite, Jonathan Cain) - 4:07
 "Midnight Rendezvous" (Waite, Cain) - 3:36
 "Union Jack" (Waite, Ricky Phillips) - 5:42
 "In Your Eyes" (Waite, Phillips) - 4:05
 "Anytime" (Waite, Tony Brock, Phillips, Wally Stocker, Cain) - 3:21
 "Jesus, Are You There?" (Waite, Stocker, Cain) - 3:34
 "Turn Around in Tokyo" (Cain) Lead vocals - Jonathan Cain  - 3:53
 "Love Is Just a Mystery" (Waite, Brock, Stocker) - 3:32

Personnel

Band
 John Waite: lead vocals
 Wally Stocker: guitar
 Jonathan Cain: keyboards, backing vocals
 Ricky Phillips: bass
 Tony Brock: drums
with:
 Anne Marie Leclerc - backing vocals on "True Love True Confession"

Charts 
Album

Singles

References

1980 albums
The Babys albums
Albums produced by Keith Olsen
Chrysalis Records albums
Albums recorded at Sound City Studios